Ankyrin repeat domain 31 is a protein that in humans is encoded by the ANKRD31 gene.

References

Further reading